The painted narrowmouth toad or slender-digit chorus frog (Kaloula picta) is a species of frog in the family Microhylidae.

It is endemic to the Philippines, where it is found throughout the archipelago, including Palawan.

Habitat
Its natural habitats are subtropical or tropical moist lowland forests, subtropical or tropical moist shrubland, subtropical or tropical seasonally wet or flooded lowland grassland, rivers, intermittent rivers, freshwater lakes, intermittent freshwater lakes, freshwater marshes, intermittent freshwater marshes, arable land, pastureland, plantations, rural gardens, urban areas, water storage areas, ponds, aquaculture ponds, irrigated land, and seasonally flooded agricultural land. Humans may have facilitated the dispersal of K. picta in the Philippines as forests were converted into agricultural-use land.

References

Kaloula
Amphibians of the Philippines
Endemic fauna of the Philippines
Amphibians described in 1841
Taxa named by André Marie Constant Duméril
Taxonomy articles created by Polbot